Kevin Andre Dean Hurdle (born 30 December 1976) is a Bermudian former cricketer. He played as a right-handed batsman and a right-arm fast bowler. He played for Bermuda in 19 One Day Internationals, making his debut at this level against Zimbabwe in May 2006.

External links
 

1976 births
Living people
Bermudian cricketers
Bermuda One Day International cricketers